Datun Subdistrict is a subdistrict on northwest of Chaoyang District, Beijing, China. It borders Aoyuncun Subdistrict to the north and west, Laiguangying Township and Wangjing Subdistrict to the east, Yayuncun and Xiaoguan Subdistrict to the south. As of 2020, its population was 132,457.

The name of this subdistrict was from Datun Village, which was historically a station for crops or military personnel.

History

Administrative Division 
As of 2021, there are a total of 20 communities within Datun Subdistrict:

References 

Chaoyang District, Beijing
Subdistricts of Beijing